Genison Piacentini de Quadra, nickname Neno (born October 14, 1988 in Criciúma, Santa Catarina) is a professional Brazilian football player, who plays for Ipatinga Futebol Clube.

Career 
Genison Nenu began his career in Brazilian clubs. He played in Greece and on May 10, 2010 joined on loan to December 2010 to Karpaty Lviv in Ukrainian Premier League.

References

External links 
Official Rio Claro team website (Por)

Profile at FFU Site (Ukr)

1988 births
Living people
Brazilian footballers
Brazilian expatriate footballers
AEK Athens F.C. players
FC Karpaty Lviv players
FC Sevastopol players
Criciúma Esporte Clube players
Paraná Clube players
Clube Náutico Capibaribe players
Ipatinga Futebol Clube players
Associação Atlética Francana players
Expatriate footballers in Greece
Expatriate footballers in Ukraine
Brazilian expatriate sportspeople in Ukraine
Association football defenders